Kingston upon Thames was an ancient parish in the county of Surrey, England. By 1839 it contained these chapelries, curacies or ecclesiastical parishes which eventually became civil parishes in their own right:

It follows from the above list of chapelries and the hamlet of Hook, frequently listed in the medieval age that, well before the Conquest, the ancient parish was the Kingston hundred (of Surrey).  There soon was a southern exception to this. By the 1086 snapshot of the Domesday Book, Long Ditton (which included exclave Tolworth east of Hook hamlet) had a fully-fledged church likely gaining its independence around that time as recorded throughout the high medieval age and onwards. Thus, in the grant of Kingston church and Long Ditton church to Merton Priory, soon after its foundation in 1117, Long Ditton does not appear as a chapelry of Kingston.

The residual Church of England ecclesiastical parish essentially divides sixfold:
All Saints - whole riverside strip -  1 church
St Peter, Norbiton - 2 churches
St Luke - 1 church - between railway and the Kingston Academy/Wolsey park
Kingston Hill, St Paul - 1 church
Kingston upon Thames, St John the Evangelist - Penrhyn Road & The Grove southern area - 1 church
Kingston Vale, St John the Baptist - 1 church

References

Former civil parishes in London
History of the Royal Borough of Kingston upon Thames